Novovochepshy is a rural locality (a khutor) in Vochepshiyskoye Rural Settlement of Teuchezhsky District, the Republic of Adygea, Russia. The population was 169 as of 2018. There are 2 streets.

Geography 
Novovochepshy is located 10 km west of Ponezhukay (the district's administrative centre) by road. Vochepshy is the nearest rural locality.

Ethnicity 
The khutor is inhabited by Adighes.

References 

Rural localities in Teuchezhsky District